Chaman Mixed is a passenger train operated daily by Pakistan Railways between Quetta and Chaman.

Route 
 Quetta to Chaman via Rohri–Chaman Railway Line

Station stops

Equipment 
Chaman Mixed only offers economy class seating.

References 

Named passenger trains of Pakistan
Passenger trains in Pakistan
Rail transport in Balochistan, Pakistan